The Holly Springs National Forest (HSNF) was established by the United States Forest Service on June 15, 1936, during the tenure of United States Department of Agriculture Chief Forester Ferdinand A. Silcox. That same year, it was combined administratively with the Bienville, De Soto and Homochitto national forests, known collectively as "National Forests in Mississippi".

Before the HSNF was established, much of the land was abandoned agricultural land with rapidly eroding soils. These rolling hills are now covered with loblolly and shortleaf pines, and upland hardwoods. The Civilian Conservation Corps used loblolly pine because it was easy to plant, was suitable for the depleted soils of the north central hills, and cast a large load of needles to help prevent further erosion.
The land owned by the Forest Service is intermingled with private farms and woodlots. The district ranger for the HSNF is headquartered in Oxford, Mississippi.

In 1983, the Reagan administration proposed auctioning off the entire national forest to private bidders as part of a nationwide asset management program. The plan was largely abandoned.

Location
The HSNF is located in northern Mississippi and is divided into two major sections. The largest section lies to the southeast of the city of Holly Springs and straddles U.S. Highway 78. In descending order of land area the forest is located in parts of Benton, Lafayette, Marshall, Yalobusha, Tippah, and Union counties.

Recreation
The Chewalla Lake, Puskus Lake, Lake Tillatoba, Baker's Pond Hiking Trail, and North Cypress Non-Motorized Trail recreation areas are found in the Holly Springs National Forest, offering varying levels of facilities and services (campgrounds, picnic areas, swimming beaches and/or hiking trails).

The Forest Service began working with the Wolf River Conservancy in 1999 to develop hiking trails there.

References

External links

 National Forests in Mississippi
 Forest History Society – summary of Reagan Administration asset management plan
 Current federal projects and planning in the HSNF
 Wolf River Conservancy

National Forests of Mississippi
Civilian Conservation Corps in Mississippi
Protected areas of Yalobusha County, Mississippi
Protected areas of Benton County, Mississippi
Protected areas of Lafayette County, Mississippi
Protected areas of Marshall County, Mississippi
Protected areas of Tippah County, Mississippi
Protected areas of Union County, Mississippi